Everybody Knows This Is Nowhere is the second studio album by Canadian-American musician Neil Young, released in May 1969 on Reprise Records, catalogue number RS 6349. His first with longtime backing band Crazy Horse, it peaked at number 34 on the US Billboard 200 in August 1970 during a 98-week chart stay and has been certified platinum by the RIAA. The album is on the list of 1001 Albums You Must Hear Before You Die. In 2003, the album was ranked number 208 on Rolling Stone magazine's list of The 500 Greatest Albums of All Time and at number 407 in the 2020 edition. It was voted number 124 in the third edition of Colin Larkin's All Time Top 1000 Albums (2000).

Production
The album contains four songs that became standards in Young's performance repertoire: "Cinnamon Girl", "Down by the River", the title track, and "Cowgirl in the Sand", all of which were written in a single day while Young had a 103 °F (39.5 °C) fever. Young's lead vocal track on the song "Everybody Knows This Is Nowhere" (on the original album) was actually a temporary scratch vocal he sang through the low-quality talk-back microphone on the mixing board, with no effects such as reverb. Young liked the stark contrast to the rest of the recording.

Everybody Knows This Is Nowhere was remastered and released on HDCD-encoded compact disc and digital download on July 14, 2009, as part of the Neil Young Archives Original Release Series. It was released on audiophile vinyl in December 2009, both individually and as part of a 1000-copy box-set of Young's first four LPs available through his website. A CD version of 3000 copies also exists. A high resolution digital Blu-ray is planned, although no release date has been set.

Packaging
The front cover is a grainy photo depicting Young leaning against a tree with his dog Winnipeg at his feet. The photographer was Frank Bez.

Reception

Upon its release, Everybody Knows This Is Nowhere received generally favorable reviews from critics. Bruce Miroff of Rolling Stone wrote a favorable review, describing Young's voice as "perpetually mournful, without being maudlin or pathetic. It hints at a world in which sorrow underlies everything [...] because that world is recognizable to most of us, Young's singing is often strangely moving." Despite stating that "in several respects [the album] falls short of his previous effort" and that "the lyricism of the first album can only be found in faint traces," he concluded that the album "offers ample rewards. Young's music partially makes up for its lack of grace by its energy and its assurance." Robert Christgau wrote in The Village Voice that "Young is a strange artist and I am not all the way into him yet, but this record is haunting". The original review was printed with a grade of "B+", but Christgau later said he would have changed it to an "A−".

In a retrospective review in Rolling Stone, Greg Kot called the record "raw, rushed, energised", and the band's interplay "at once primitive and abstract", a "gloriously spontaneous sound" that "would endure, not only as a blueprint for Young...but as an influence on countless bands." William Ruhlmann of music database website AllMusic said of the album, "released only four months after his first [album], [it] was nearly a total rejection of that polished effort." He noted that "Cinnamon Girl," "Down by the River," and "Cowgirl in the Sand" were "useful as frames on which to hang the extended improvisations Young played with Crazy Horse and to reflect the ominous tone of his singing". He concluded that the album "set a musical pattern Young and his many musical descendants have followed ever since [...] and a lot of contemporary bands were playing music clearly influenced by it". Mark Richardson of Pitchfork wrote, "the opening riff to 'Cinnamon Girl' erases the memory of Neil Young completely in about five seconds" and that "Crazy Horse were loose and sloppy, privileging groove and feeling above all". He also said that "Young sounds comfortable and confident, singing with the versatile voice that has changed remarkably little in the 40 years since" and concluded that it "was a sort of big bang for Young, a dense moment of creative explosion that saw possibilities expanding in every direction".

In 2003, the album was ranked number 208 on Rolling Stone magazine's list of The 500 Greatest Albums of All Time, and 210 in a 2012 revised list, and number 407 in the 2020 edition. In 2013, the album was ranked 398 on NMEs list of the '500 Greatest Albums of all time'. In 2018, the album won the Polaris Heritage Prize Audience Award in the 1960-1975 category.

Releases
Everybody Knows This Is Nowhere was originally released on vinyl by Reprise on May 14, 1969. It was first released on CD in December 1987.

A remastered version was released on HDCD-encoded CD and digital download on July 14, 2009 as part of the Neil Young Archives Original Release Series. The remastered CD exists both as a standalone album and as Disc 2 of a 4-CD box set Official Release Series Discs 1-4, released in the US in 2009 and Europe in 2012.

Digital high-resolution files of the album are also available via the Neil Young Archives website.

Track listing
All tracks are written by Neil Young. Track timings are from the original 1969 vinyl release, catalogue number RS 6349.

Personnel 
 Neil Young – guitar, lead vocals

Crazy Horse
 Danny Whitten – guitar, harmony vocals, co-lead vocal on "Cinnamon Girl"
 Billy Talbot – bass guitar
 Ralph Molina – drums, harmony vocals

Additional musicians
 Bobby Notkoff – violin on "Running Dry (Requiem for the Rockets)"
 Robin Lane – harmony vocal on "Round and Round"

Technical
 David Briggs – engineer, producer
 Neil Young – producer
 Henry Saskowski – engineer
 Kendal Pacios – engineer

Charts

Weekly charts

Singles

Year End Chart

Certifications

References

1969 albums
Neil Young albums
Albums produced by David Briggs (producer)
Reprise Records albums
Albums produced by Neil Young
Crazy Horse (band) albums
Albums recorded at Wally Heider Studios
Hard rock albums by Canadian artists